Lemuel F. Holland (July 28, 1840 – January 13, 1914) was a Union Army soldier in the American Civil War who received the U.S. military's highest decoration, the Medal of Honor.

Holland was born in Burlington, Ohio on July 28, 1840, and entered service at LaSalle County, Illinois. He was awarded the Medal of Honor, for extraordinary heroism on July 2, 1863, while serving as a corporal with Company D, 104th Illinois Volunteer Infantry Regiment, at Elk River, Tennessee. His Medal of Honor was issued on October 30, 1897.

He died at the age of 73, on January 13, 1914, and was buried at the Greenwood Cemetery in Decatur, Illinois.

Medal of Honor citation

References

External links
 

1840 births
1914 deaths
People from Lawrence County, Ohio
Burials in Illinois
Union Army soldiers
United States Army Medal of Honor recipients
American Civil War recipients of the Medal of Honor
People of Illinois in the American Civil War